Hubert Ferguson (23 May 1926 – July 1994) was a Northern Irish professional footballer who played as a full back.

Career
After playing in his native Northern Ireland for Ballymena United, Ferguson moved to England to play with Bradford City. After making 132 appearances in the Football League between 1948 and 1952, Ferguson then played non-league football with Frickley Colliery, but returned to league football in 1954 with Halifax Town. In total he made 227 appearances in the Football League.

References

1926 births
1994 deaths
Association footballers from Northern Ireland
Ballymena United F.C. players
Bradford City A.F.C. players
Frickley Athletic F.C. players
English Football League players
Halifax Town A.F.C. players
Association footballers from Belfast
Association football fullbacks